Duluth and Northeastern 29 is a preserved 0-6-0 switcher steam locomotive built in 1944 by the Lima Locomotive Works for the United States Army Transportation Corps. It is currently owned and operated by the Prairie Village, Herman and Milwaukee Railroad in Prairie Village, South Dakota.

History

Revenue service 
No. 29 was initially constructed by the Lima Locomotive Works in Lima, Ohio in January 1944 for the United States War Department during World War II as locomotive No. 4047. It was part of the S155 class 0-6-0 switchers, designed to be used for military service in the Far East, Africa, and Europe, but No. 4047 remained on North American soil. The locomotive was instead used for switching in United States military bases. After the war, the locomotive was sold in March 1947 to the Bay Terminal Railroad (BTR), who renumbered it to 111. The BTR used the locomotive to switch freight cars between different areas in rail yards and harbors within the city of Toledo, Ohio. In August 1955, No. 111 was sold again to the Iron and Steel Processing Corporation, who in turn, sold it in April the following year to the Duluth and Northeastern Railroad (D&NE), where the locomotive was renumbered to 29. The locomotive was moved to D&NE trackage in Cloquet, Minnesota, where it was assigned to switch freight cars loaded with lumber. It was retired from revenue service in 1965, and it was subsequently stored in a sideline in Cloquet.

Preservation 
In 1970, No. 29 was sold to Earl Grice of North Mankato, Minnesota. In 1976, the locomotive was sold again to the Historic Prairie Village, Herman and Milwaukee Railroad (PVH&M), who operates on former Milwaukee Road trackage in Prairie Village near Lake Herman State Park in South Dakota. The locomotive was moved to Prairie Village the following year, and work began to restore the locomotive to operating condition. The No. 29 locomotive was subsequently used to pull 2-mile tourist trains in and out of Prairie Village. In 1999, though, No. 29 was removed from service after problems with its firebox were discovered. PVH&M crews subsequently spent the next thirteen years repairing the locomotive's firebox, and in 2013, the locomotive returned to service. As of 2023, No. 29 remains operational, carrying several passengers on a loop track line around Prairie Village, and whenever the winter season arrives, No. 29 is stored indoors along with the PVH&M's diesel locomotives.

See also 

 Duluth and Northeastern 28
 United States Army 4039
 Soo Line 353
 Santa Fe 3415

References 

Lima locomotives
United States Army locomotives
0-6-0 locomotives
Preserved steam locomotives of South Dakota
Individual locomotives of the United States
Railway locomotives introduced in 1944
Standard gauge locomotives of the United States